Hiccoda dosaroides is a moth of the family Erebidae first described by Frederic Moore in 1882. It is found in Sri Lanka.

References

Moths of Asia
Moths described in 1882
Boletobiinae